Mecyna is a genus of moths of the family Crambidae. The genus was first described by Henry Doubleday in 1849.

Species
Mecyna albalis Amsel, 1961
Mecyna arroundella (Schmidt, 1934)
Mecyna asiaticalis (Caradja, 1916)
Mecyna asinalis (Hübner, 1819)
Mecyna atlanticum (Bethune-Baker, 1894)
Mecyna auralis (Peyerimhoff, 1872)
Mecyna babalis Amsel, 1970
Mecyna bandiamiralis Amsel, 1970
Mecyna biternalis (Mann, 1862)
Mecyna cocosica Munroe, 1959
Mecyna cuprinalis Ragonot, 1895
Mecyna flavalis (Denis & Schiffermüller, 1775)
Mecyna fuscimaculalis (Grote, 1878)
Mecyna gracilis (Butler, 1879)
Mecyna grisealis Amsel, 1961
Mecyna indistinctalis Amsel, 1961
Mecyna luscitialis (Barnes & McDunnough, 1914)
Mecyna lutealis (Duponchel, 1833)
Mecyna luteofluvalis Mutuura, 1954
Mecyna marcidalis (Fuchs, 1879)
Mecyna marioni Amsel, 1957
Mecyna mauretanica Slamka, 2013
Mecyna micalis (Caradja, 1916)
Mecyna mustelinalis (Packard, 1873)
Mecyna procillusalis (Walker, 1859)
Mecyna prunipennis Butler, 1879
Mecyna quinquigera (Moore, 1888)
Mecyna salangalis Amsel, 1970
Mecyna sefidalis (Amsel, 1950)
Mecyna submedialis (Grote, 1876)
Mecyna subsequalis (Herrich-Schäffer, 1843-1856)
Mecyna suffusalis (Warren, 1892)
Mecyna tapa (Strand, 1918)
Mecyna tricolor (Butler, 1879)
Mecyna trinalis (Denis & Schiffermüller, 1775)

Former species
Mecyna andalusica (Staudinger, 1879)
Mecyna catalalis Viette, 1953
Mecyna lutalbalis (Caradja, 1916)
Mecyna lutulentalis (Lederer, 1858)
Mecyna pistorialis (Zerny, 1934)

References

Spilomelinae
Crambidae genera
Taxa named by Henry Doubleday